Elizabeth Herdman Lepper OBE, M.B., B.S. (3 July 1883 – 23 December 1971) was a British physician and pathologist. She served in the Royal Army Medical Corps in World War I. Member of the Association of Registered Medical Woman and the Pathological Society.

Education 
Lepper trained at the London School of Medicine for Women (now the Royal Free Hospital) and graduated in 1907.

Training and career 
Lepper was appointed to junior positions at the Royal Free and the Elizabeth Garrett Anderson Hospital. She was the Richard Hollins research scholar at the Middlesex Hospital, in the cancer research department. She was also the Beit Memorial Fellow in medical research, and also attended outpatients at the South London Hospital.

During World War I Louisa Aldrich-Blake, then surgeon at the Elizabeth Garrett Anderson Hospital and Dean of the London School of Medicine for Women, approached all the women on the Medical Register, to ask if they would be willing to serve with the Royal Army Medical Corps. Lepper was one of the 48 women who enrolled, and for this work she was awarded the OBE.

On her return to the Elizabeth Garret Anderson Hospital in 1920 she became a pathologist, which role she performed until her retirement in 1937. During that time, she was also working at the Lister Institute                                                                                                                                                                                                                                                   She was known to be a great improviser and it was being said among the colleges, that if she was stranded on a desert island would set up a working laboratory within weeks.

Later life 
On her retirement she travelled the world, until returning to the United Kingdom before the outbreak of World War II. She lived with Dorothy Christian Hare, her long-time friend and fellow physician in Falmouth, and was a member of local societies promoting local theatre and the arts. She followed various hobbies and interests like natural history, travelling, and playing the violin. She died at her home on 23 December 1971 at the age of 88.

References

1883 births
1971 deaths
20th-century British medical doctors
Women medical researchers
Women pathologists
People from Falmouth, Cornwall
English pathologists
Physicians of the Royal Free Hospital
Physicians of the Middlesex Hospital
Cancer researchers
English women medical doctors
20th-century women physicians
20th-century English women
20th-century English people